Michelle Maxwell MacLaren is a Canadian television director and producer. She has directed episodes of The X-Files, Better Call Saul, Breaking Bad, The Walking Dead, Game of Thrones, and Westworld.

MacLaren won two back-to-back Primetime Emmy Awards for producing Breaking Bad in 2013 and 2014.

Early life
MacLaren grew up in Vancouver, British Columbia. She graduated from Queen's University in Kingston, Ontario. MacLaren is a cousin of television anchor Ashleigh Banfield.

Career

MacLaren made her directorial debut on the season nine episode of The X-Files, "John Doe", which was written by her future Breaking Bad collaborator Vince Gilligan. She approaches shooting action sequences as mathematical deconstruction and likes using multiple cameras and wide lenses.

She was nominated for six Primetime Emmy Awards, all for Breaking Bad: one for directing the episode "One Minute" (season 3, episode 7) in 2010, one for directing the episode "Gliding Over All" (season 5, episode 8) in 2013, and the other four in 2010, 2012, 2013 and 2014 for Outstanding Drama Series, on which she served as an executive producer, winning in 2013 and 2014. She was also nominated for three Producers Guild of America Award for Best Episodic Drama for Breaking Bad, winning in 2014 and 2015. On the tenth anniversary of the premiere of Breaking Bad, io9 singled out MacLaren among the breakout directors on the series as the MVP, noting she directed 11 episodes, more than any other director.

In June 2014, it was announced MacLaren had signed a two-year first-look deal with HBO.

In November 2014, it was announced that MacLaren would develop the script and direct Wonder Woman, the iconic character's first solo cinematic appearance and the fourth installment of the DC Extended Universe. However, in April 2015 MacLaren left the project due to "creative differences".

She was the executive producer of and directed the pilot for David Simon's HBO drama The Deuce. She was the first director hired and established the overall 1970s tone and style of the show.

In August 2016, it was announced that MacLaren would direct the film adaptation of Kristin Hannah's novel The Nightingale. She was attracted to the prospect of directing The Nightingale because it is a "muscular" project and the female characters are unsuspecting heroes.

The same year she also directed the ninth episode of the HBO series Westworld. When the directors of the final season of Game of Thrones were announced, several prominent news sites, including Polygon and Nerdist, expressed disappointment that MacLaren, the only woman to direct on the series, was not included.

In December 2017, MacLaren visited the Dubai International Film Festival as a guest of OSN.

On January 31, 2018, MacLaren was confirmed as director for the film Cowboy Ninja Viking.

She is developing a miniseries for HBO with Breaking Bad co-producer Vince Gilligan called Raven, based on the Jonestown massacre.

Filmography

References

External links
 

Canadian expatriates in the United States
Canadian television producers
Canadian women television producers
Canadian television directors
Living people
People from Vancouver
Queen's University at Kingston alumni
Year of birth missing (living people)
Canadian women television directors